Tenchu: Fatal Shadows is an action-adventure stealth video game developed by K2 LLC and published by FromSoftware in Japan and Sega in North America and Europe for the PlayStation 2 in 2004. The PlayStation Portable version of the game, Tenchu Kurenai Portable, was released in Japan in 2010.

Gameplay

This game is much like that of Wrath of Heaven, the previous entry in the series, with the ability to drag off the victims' dead bodies after a kill making a return. Instead of Kanji points being increased after a stealth kill, scrolls are gathered. Double stealth kills are possible when two enemies are together. Each stealth kill has a name listed below as it's played out.

Plot
In a time of feudal wars, Rikimaru and Ayame, two ninja of the Azuma Ninja Clan, served Lord Gohda by returning his precious daughter, Princess Kiku, from the hands of Lord Mei-Oh. Unfortunately, Rikimaru was caught in a disastrous rockfall during his escape, in an attempt to save Ayame and Princess Kiku, and is still missing. The land of Gohda remained peaceful after Lord Mei-Oh's attack, and Ayame, as an agent of Lord Gohda, continued to patrol the expansive territory.

One day in her travels, Ayame came across a destroyed ninja village. She hoped to find survivors, but arrived too late. The ninja of Hagakure died whispering the "Kuroya" with their final breaths. As Ayame was about to leave, a young female ninja stood in her way. Her name was Rin, back from her training, and devastated to see her village in ruins. She sees Ayame as the only person alive, and blames her for the destroying of her village. Eventually, Rin sees that it was not Ayame that destroyed her village. The two team up to find the people responsible.

Characters

Rin
Rin is a playable character and she replaces Rikimaru as a protagonist of the story. The last of the Hagakure, her village was burned and her family killed by the Kuroya. She is voiced by Satsuki Yukino and Allison Scagliotti.

Rin is a young girl who has trained in the arts of assassination and unarmed combat since childhood. She was born and raised in a small ninja village that lies on the border of "Hagakure." After her village was destroyed, Rin has sought to avenge the deaths of her loved ones, working as a hired assassin for “Lady Razor” Ogin. Upon encountering Ayame, the two briefly battle, although Rin soon realizes that the other kunoichi is not responsible for the destruction of her village. The pair then form an alliance so that they may better achieve their personal agendas. Rin wields a sword called Natsume, but prefers to fight in unarmed combat, like Tesshu and Tatsumaru. She seeks to avenge her slain kin.

Ayame
Second playable character, a longtime member of the Azuma Ninja Clan.

Kuroya
The enemies of this game are called the Kuroya, a group of evil ninja who are led by Jyuzou:

Jyuzou - He is the supreme leader of the Kuroya, and is responsible for the destruction of his hometown, Hagakure village. He was actually next in line to become the next leader of the Hagakure, but refused to live by the rules set before him. Jyuzou's weapon is a blade concealed within a parasol. He had been Rin's fiancé before he betrayed the Hagakure and has since been pursued by Rin, seeking revenge.
Futaba - One of the Kuroya assassins and the younger sister of Hitoha. She is another ex-member of Rin's clan who betrayed her friends and family and proved loyal in service to Jyuzou. Futaba considered Rin her rival and hated her deeply. She wields a crossbow-type device that shoots knives from a distance while battling alongside her twin brother.
Hitoha - Just like Rin, he is from the Hagakure village. Along with his twin sister, he followed Jyuzou and betrayed the rest of the village. Hitoha fights with a pyrotechnic gauntlet on his wrist which can eject streams of fire at his enemies, combining the use of such a device with his athletic prowess and mastery of ninja mysticism.
Ranzou - An assassin for the Kuroya who delights himself in torturing people. He is a twisted individual who derives pleasure from the pain of women; at the moment when Ayame finds him, he is torturing Rin's master, Lady Ogin. There are many of the Kuroya who look down on preying upon the weak, but Ranzou takes pride in his work. Ranzou fights with two katana swords connected together on end. He was voiced by Roger L. Jackson
Shou - An effeminate, narcissistic assassin of the Kuroya who disguises himself as a musician. He joined the Kuroya around the same time as Shinogi and is Jyuzou's personal favorite of the Kuroya, armed with a shamisen (a Japanese three-stringed guitar) which hides a powerful gun within. Together with Ranzou both of them are a powerful team in the Kuroya.
Shinogi - An assassin for the Kuroya, it is his life goal to kill one thousand people before he himself dies. He joined the Kuroya after meeting Jyuzou for he saw an opportunity to kill with abandon. Shinogi fights with three swords, one of which is in his mouth.

Other characters
Katsuragi - A samurai-turned bandit, Katsuragi is a member of the Iwatsu clan with price on his head.
Kichigorou - A man who works as assassin for the Beniya, and also a Goda spy. His real name is Mimizuku, but only Ayame knows this. He also might kill Rin but luckily, Rin does not know the secret of the letter. He was Rin's partner.
Nasu - A blind man who pretends to be a masseuse to get into the homes of women, where he uses his technique to immobilize them. He hides a sword within his walking stick. Nasu is an entirely different enemy sharing the same name as one in the previous title. His appearance and fighting style make him an homage to Zatoichi.
Ogin - Also known as "Lady Razor," this woman serves as Rin's employer and as head of the Beniya assassins. Her name is infamous in the criminal underworld.
Tatsukichi - A geisha in the village of Hagogake who is blindly in love with Jyuzou, who sends her to her death to fight Ayame as distraction so he can escape. She is the weakest boss in the game, attacking with a poisoned knife while cringing in fear, but willing to fight in the death of Jyuzou's name. When defeated, she asks Jyuzou to forgive her failure, but he refuses while impaling her on his sword, stating that he "hates needy women".

Tenchu Kurenai Portable
The PlayStation Portable version of the game, Tenchu Kurenai Portable, was released in Japan in 2010. The game has been optimized for the PSP's screen size, and featured tweaked graphics and a new character costume.

Reception

Tenchu: Fatal Shadows received "mixed or average" reviews, according to review aggregator Metacritic.

Notes

References

External links
Official website (Tenchu: Kurenai) 
Official website (Tenchu: Kurenai Portable) 

2004 video games
Action-adventure games
FromSoftware games
PlayStation 2 games
PlayStation Portable games
Sega video games
Tenchu games
Video game spin-offs
Video games featuring female protagonists
Video games scored by Kota Hoshino
Video games developed in Japan